Delavalia is a genus of copepods in the family Miraciidae.

Species 
The World Register of Marine Species currently lists the following species as accepted within Delavalia:

 Delavalia acutirostris (Willey, 1935)
 Delavalia adriatica (Marinov & Apostolov, 1981)
 Delavalia andamanica (Rao, 1993)
 Delavalia arctica Scott T., 1899
 Delavalia arenicola (Wilson C.B., 1932)
 Delavalia bermudensis (Coull, 1969)
 Delavalia bifidia (Coull, 1967)
 Delavalia breviseta (Wells & Rao, 1987)
 Delavalia clavus (Wells & Rao, 1987)
 Delavalia coineauae (Soyer, 1972)
 Delavalia confluens (Lang, 1948)
 Delavalia cornuta (Lang, 1936)
 Delavalia diegensis (Thistle & Coull, 1979)
 Delavalia elisabethae (Por, 1959)
 Delavalia fustiger (Wells & Rao, 1987)
 Delavalia giesbrechti Scott T., 1896
 Delavalia gundulae (Willen, 2003)
 Delavalia hirtipes (Wells & Rao, 1987)
 Delavalia incerta (Por, 1964)
 Delavalia inopinata Scott A., 1902
 Delavalia intermedia (Marinov & Apostolov, 1981)
 Delavalia islandica (Schriever, 1982)
 Delavalia latioperculata Itô Tat, 1981
 Delavalia latipes (Lang, 1965)
 Delavalia latisetosa (Sewell, 1940)
 Delavalia lima (Becker & Schriever, 1979)
 Delavalia longicaudata (Boeck, 1872)
 Delavalia longifurca (Sewell, 1934)
 Delavalia longipilosa (Lang, 1965)
 Delavalia madrasensis (Wells, 1971)
 Delavalia magnacaudata (Monard, 1928)
 Delavalia mastigochaeta (Wells, 1965)
 Delavalia minuta Scott A., 1902
 Delavalia mixta (Wells & Rao, 1987)
 Delavalia noodti (Schriever, 1982)
 Delavalia normani Scott T., 1905
 Delavalia nuwukensis (Wilson, M.S., 1965)
 Delavalia oblonga (Lang, 1965)
 Delavalia ornamentalia (Shen & Tai, 1965)
 Delavalia palustris Brady, 1868
 Delavalia paraclavus (Wells & Rao, 1987)
 Delavalia polluta (Monard, 1928)
 Delavalia reflexa Brady & Robertson, 1876
 Delavalia saharae (Marinov & Apostolov, 1985)
 Delavalia schminkei (Willen, 2002)
 Delavalia stephensoni (Greenwood & Tucker, 1984)
 Delavalia tethysensis (Monard, 1928)
 Delavalia truncatipes (Sewell, 1940)
 Delavalia unisetosa (Wells, 1967)
 Delavalia valens (Wells & Rao, 1987)

References

Harpacticoida
Crustaceans described in 1868
Crustacean genera